The 1951 New York Yankees season was the 49th season for the team. The team finished with a record of 98–56, winning their 18th pennant, finishing five games ahead of the Cleveland Indians. New York was managed by Casey Stengel. The Yankees played at Yankee Stadium. In the World Series, they defeated the New York Giants in 6 games.

This year was noted for a "changing of the guard" for the Yankees, as it was Joe DiMaggio's final season and Mickey Mantle's first. The 1951 season also marked the first year of Bob Sheppard's long tenure as Yankee Stadium's public address announcer.

Offseason
 Prior to 1951 season (exact date unknown)
Jerry Lumpe was signed as an amateur free agent by the Yankees.
Don Taussig was acquired from the Yankees by the New York Giants.

Regular season
 April 17, 1951: Mickey Mantle makes his big league debut for the New York Yankees. The Yankees opponent is the Boston Red Sox.
 May 1, 1951: Mickey Mantle hits his first major league home run. The game was played against the Chicago White Sox and the pitcher who gave up the home run was Randy Gumpert. The home run was in the sixth inning and was measured at 450 feet.
 September 18, 1951: Allie Reynolds threw a no-hitter to clinch the American League pennant. It was the first time that a pitcher threw a no-hitter to clinch a pennant.

Season standings

Record vs. opponents

Notable transactions
 May 14, 1951: Billy Johnson was traded by the Yankees to the St. Louis Cardinals for Don Bollweg and $15,000.

Roster

Player stats

Batting

Starters by position
Note: Pos = Position; G = Games played; AB = At bats; H = Hits; Avg. = Batting average; HR = Home runs; RBI = Runs batted in

Other batters
Note: G = Games played; AB = At bats; H = Hits; Avg. = Batting average; HR = Home runs; RBI = Runs batted in

Pitching

Starting pitchers
Note: G = Games pitched; IP = Innings pitched; W = Wins; L = Losses; ERA = Earned run average; SO = Strikeouts

Other pitchers
Note: G = Games pitched; IP = Innings pitched; W = Wins; L = Losses; ERA = Earned run average; SO = Strikeouts

Relief pitchers
Note: G = Games pitched; W = Wins; L = Losses; SV = Saves; ERA = Earned run average; SO = Strikeouts

1951 World Series 

AL New York Yankees (4) vs. NL New York Giants (2)

Awards and honors
 Yogi Berra, American League MVP
 Phil Rizzuto, Babe Ruth Award
All-Star Game

Farm system

LEAGUE CHAMPIONS: Quincy, Norfolk, LaGrange, McAlester

Newark club folded, July 17, 1951

References

External links
1951 New York Yankees at Baseball Reference
1951 World Series
1951 New York Yankees team page at www.baseball-almanac.com

New York Yankees seasons
New York Yankees
New York Yankees
1950s in the Bronx
American League champion seasons
World Series champion seasons